Cleve is a given name. Notable people with the name include:
 Cleve Benedict (born 1935), American retired politician
 Cleve Bryant (1947-2023), American college football quarterback, athletics administrator and former head coach at Ohio University
 Cleve Cartmill (1908–1964), American science fiction and fantasy writer, best remembered for a short story investigated by the FBI
 Cleve Gray (1918–2004), American abstract expressionist painter
 Cleve Jones (born 1954), American AIDS and LGBT rights activist
 Cleve Loney (1950–2020), American politician
 Cleve Moler (born 1939), American mathematician and computer scientist

Surnames
English masculine given names
Masculine given names